Łukasz Kubot and Marcelo Melo were the reigning champions from when the tournament was last held in 2019, but lost in the semifinals to Ivan Dodig and Austin Krajicek.

Marcelo Arévalo and Matwé Middelkoop won the title, defeating Dodig and Krajicek in the final, 6–7(5–7), 7–5, [10–6].

Seeds

Draw

Draw

References

External Links
 Main Draw

Winston-Salem Open - Doubles
2021 Doubles